Marsilea crenata is a species of fern found in Southeast Asia. It is an aquatic plant looking like a four leaf clover. Leaves floating in deep water or erect in shallow water or on land. Leaflets glaucous, sporocarp ellipsoid, on stalks attached to base of petioles.

Uses
The leaves of Marsilea crenata are part of the East Javanese cuisine of Indonesia, especially in the city of Surabaya where they are served with sweet potato and Pecel spicy peanut sauce.

These leaves are also part of the Isan cuisine of Thailand, where they are known as Phak waen and eaten raw with Nam phrik chilli dip.

See also
Javanese cuisine
List of Thai ingredients

References

External links

 Thai Food
 PLANTS Profile for Marsilea crenata - USDA PLANTS

Asian vegetables
crenata
Flora of Asia
Aquatic plants
Thai cuisine
Javanese cuisine